The Bigamist can refer to the following films:

 The Bigamist (1921 film), a silent British film directed by Guy Newall
 The Bigamist (1953 film), starring Edmond O'Brien and Joan Fontaine and Ida Lupino, who also directed 
 The Bigamist (1956 film), an Italian film featuring Marcello Mastroianni